Alfred Momotenko-Levitsky (born 1970), also known as Fred Momotenko, is a Dutch composer.

Education
Alfred Momotenko-Levitsky studied percussion at the Moscow State Art and Cultural University, Russia. In 1990, he was invited to perform in the Netherlands, after which he enrolled in the Brabants Conservatory, majoring in percussion in improvised music. After graduating Momotenko continued with styding of musical theory and composition contemporary classical music and continued his study at Fontys Conservatory in Tilburg. In 2006, he graduated in composition with a Bachelor of Music. In 2009, he gained his Master of Music with distinction at Fontys Conservatorium. As a part of this program he followed sonology at the Institute of Sonology at the Royal Conservatory of The Hague.

Compositions
 Menuetto (2001) – for church organ
 Drinklied (2002) – for voice & vibraphone. Drinklied is based on the original poem from the Dutch poet Gerrit Krol. Honored with the first prize of the VSB fund Composition Concours 2002
 Eneato (2003) – for violin or viola solo 
 VariA (2003) – for Piano trio
 Les ondes de l'escarpolette (2004) – for grand piano solo
 Liquid pArts (2005) – for string quartet
 Der letzte Traum (2006) – for wind quintet 
 Chimères I (2007) – for 3 church organs
 Au clair de la lune (2008) – for 4-part vocal ensemble & surr. audio, performed during Gaudeamus Foundation music festival at Muziekgebouw aan 't IJ. It is the second Prize winner of "150-Years-of-Music-Technology Composition Competition Prize"  and the special Prize winner of Festival EmuFest in Rome.
 Cecilia (2012) – for mixed choir. "a hymn to the past as well as to the future of the monastic tradition". The world première was at Koningshoeven Abbey on Saint Cecilia's feast day, 22 November 2014.
 Cloud Messenger (2012) – for recorder, cross-media & surround audio, based on poem Meghadūta Cloud Messenger by Kalidasa. The world première was performed by Jorge Isaac at November Music.
 Les vingt doigts (2016) – piano four hands for Igor Roma and Nikola Meeuwsen, a companion piece for Les cinq doigts by Igor Stravinsky
 Danco Konsonanco (2016) - for heterogeneous ensemble: recorder, pan flute, viola, accordion and percussion. Winner in 2018 of the Prix Annelie de Man Ensemble Black Pencil Prize.
 Na Strastnoy - На Страстной (2017) – for mixed choir, a companion piece for All-Night Vigil by Sergej Rachmaninov, Op.37 based on the eponymous poem from the diptych Doktor Zhivago by Boris Pasternak. The world première was performed by Het Groot Omroepkoor (Netherlands Radio Choir) at the Royal concertgebouw Amsterdam conducted by Sigvards Kļava. Selected for performance at the ISCM World Music Days 2019 in Tallinn.
Earth's prayers (2020 - 2021) – for symphony orchestra. Companion piece for Das Lied von der Erde by Gustav Mahler, commissioned by NTR ZaterdagMatinee. The world premiere was performed by the Dutch Radio Filharmonisch Orkest at Concertgebouw Amsterdam, conducted by Vasily Petrenko
Madame en Noir (2021) – for symphony orchestra, an opening piece commissioned by Rotterdam Philharmonic Gergiev Festival and Rotterdam Philharmonic Orchestra. The world premiere was present during the opening of the 25th edition of the festival at De Doelen in Rotterdam, conducted by Valery Gergiev.

References

External links
 

1970 births
Living people
Dutch composers
Russian composers
Russian male composers
Moscow State University alumni
Russian emigrants to the Netherlands
Russian male classical composers
21st-century classical composers
20th-century classical composers
20th-century Russian male musicians
21st-century Russian male musicians
Royal Conservatory of The Hague alumni